The 2016 New Mexico Lobos football team represented the University of New Mexico during the 2016 NCAA Division I FBS football season. The Lobos were led by fifth-year head coach Bob Davie. They played their home games at University Stadium and were members of the Mountain Division of the Mountain West Conference. They finished the season 9–4, 6–2 in Mountain West play to win a share of the Mountain Division title with Boise State and Wyoming. After tiebreakers, they did not represent the Mountain Division in the Mountain West Championship Game. They were invited to the New Mexico Bowl where they defeated UTSA.

Schedule

Schedule Source:

Roster

Game summaries

South Dakota

at New Mexico State

at Rutgers

San Jose State

Boise State

vs. Air Force

Louisiana–Monroe

at Hawaii

Nevada

at Utah State

at Colorado State

Wyoming

UTSA–New Mexico Bowl

References

New Mexico
New Mexico Lobos football seasons
New Mexico Bowl champion seasons
New Mexico Lobos football